Marius Holst (born 15 January 1965) is a Norwegian filmmaker, a producer and a screenwriter.

Life

Film school student
Marius Holst studied at the London International Film School. In 1990, his diploma film was nominated for the Amanda Award for Best Short Film, and for the Student Academy Awards and won the BBC Drama Award Grand Prix Potier.

Career
In 1994 his first feature film Cross My Heart and Hope to Die was a box-office success in Norway, and became an international festival hit, winning the Prix de Montreal at the Montreal World Film Festival and the Blue Angel Award at the 45th Berlin International Film Festival.

Marius Holst is a co-founder and owner of the production company 4 ½, along with fellow director Pål Sletaune and producers Turid Øversveen and Håkon Øverås. Established in 1998, the company produces both feature films and commercials.

Filmography
 1990: Visiting Hours (Besøkstid)
 1994: Cross my Heart and Hope to Die (Ti kniver i hjertet)
 1996: Scent of Man (Lukten av mann)
 1996: 1996: Pust på meg!
 2001: Dragonfly (Øyenstikker)
 2005: Bastard (Kjøter)
 2006: Mirush (Blodsbånd)
 2010: King of Devil's Island (Kongen av Bastøy)
 2018: Mordene i Kongo

References

External links
 
 Marius Holst´s Statement about Mirush
 Interview about Dragonfly by the BBC

1965 births
Living people
Norwegian film directors
Norwegian film producers
Norwegian screenwriters
Date of birth missing (living people)
Alumni of the London Film School